Ludlow Township is one of the twenty-two townships of Washington County, Ohio, United States.  The 2000 census found 330 people in the township.

Geography
Located in the northeastern part of the county, it borders the following townships:
Washington Township, Monroe County - north
Benton Township, Monroe County - northeast corner
Grandview Township - east
Independence Township - south
Liberty Township - west
Bethel Township, Monroe County - northwest

No municipalities are located in Ludlow Township, although the unincorporated community of Wingett Run lies in the township's west.

Name and history
It is the only Ludlow Township statewide.

Government
The township is governed by a three-member board of trustees, who are elected in November of odd-numbered years to a four-year term beginning on the following January 1. Two are elected in the year after the presidential election and one is elected in the year before it. There is also an elected township fiscal officer, who serves a four-year term beginning on April 1 of the year after the election, which is held in November of the year before the presidential election. Vacancies in the fiscal officership or on the board of trustees are filled by the remaining trustees.

References

External links
County website

Townships in Washington County, Ohio
Townships in Ohio